Montpezat-de-Quercy (literally Montpezat of Quercy) is a commune in the Tarn-et-Garonne département in the Occitanie région in southern France.

The commune has been listed as a protected town, mainly thanks to its 14th-century church, which contains tapestries from the sixteenth century relating the life of St Martin.

Demographics

See also
Communes of the Tarn-et-Garonne department

References

External links

 Site of Montpezat-de-Quercy

Communes of Tarn-et-Garonne